From Me to You is the first full album by the Japanese artist and songwriter Yui. It was released on February 22, 2006.

The album returned onto the Oricon Top 20 album charts due to the promotion of Yui's 5th single, "Good-bye Days", and the movie Midnight Sun. This album reached #4 rank weekly, charted for 121 weeks and sold more than 260,000 copies.

Track listing

References

2006 debut albums
Yui (singer) albums
Sony Music Entertainment Japan albums
Japanese-language albums